Denis Jerome (born 28 February 1939 in Paris) is a French experimental physicist in the field of condensed matter, who contributed to the discovery of superconductivity in organic conductive matter.

Career 
He studied at the Sorbonne, where he obtained his bachelor's degree in science in 1960, then the diploma of advanced studies in solid-state physics. In 1965, he obtained his doctorate in science under the supervision of Professor Anatole Abragam at the University of Paris-Saclay.

From 1965 to 1966, he worked as a post-doctoral fellow at the University of California at San Diego, in the laboratory of Professor Walter Kohn, winner of the 1998 Nobel Prize in Chemistry, where he conducted research in collaboration with Professor T. M. Rice. He then continued his post-doctoral research at Harvard University until March 1967.

In October 1962, he joined the Centre national de recherche scientifique (CNRS) as a research intern. He successively became a research master in 1970, research director in 1980, and director of research emeritus of the CNRS in 2004.

In 1967, he formed the "study group on the electronic properties of metals and alloys under very high hydrostatic pressure and low temperature" at the University of Paris-Sud at the request of Professors Jacques Friedel and André Guinier.

He is a specialist in the physics of low-dimensional electrons and the metal-insulator transition, known as Nevill Mott's transition.

Its major contribution to scientific knowledge is the discovery, in 1980, in cooperation with Professor Klaus Bechgaard, of the phenomenon of superconductivity in the organic solid with the detection of superconduction at 0.9K under a pressure of 12 kbar in Bechgaard salt (TMTSF)2PF6.

He has also contributed to the study of low-dimensional conductors, organic or inorganic, through various measurements of electronic properties under high pressure. He has published more than 380 scientific articles in international journals and several journal articles and book chapters.

He has been chief editor of several international scientific journals, Journal de Physique Lettres, Journal de Physique, European Physical Journal B and Europhysics Letters.

Within the framework of the French Academy of Sciences, of which he is a member in the Physics section, he coordinated the drafting of reports on the individual evaluation of researchers and teacher-researchers in the exact and experimental sciences in 2009, on the proper use of bibliometry in 2011 and on the new challenges of scientific publishing in 2014. He was President of the Physics section of the French Academy of Sciences from 2011 to 2015. He led a symposium on the interface between physics and chemistry in February 2013 and on the physics of condensed matter in the 21st century in January 2016.

Distinctions

Prizes 

    Bronze medal CNRS, 1965
    Laureate of the French Academy of Sciences (Doistaut-Blutel Prize), 1980
    Holweck Prize of the French Physical Society and Institute of Physics, 1985
    French Outreach Committee Award, 1990
    Hewlett Packard Europhysics Prize of the European Physical Society 1991, with Klaus Bechgaard for the discovery of organic superconduction
    Kelvin Lecturer, Society of Electrical Engineers in London, 1984
    Regent's Professor, University of California, Los Angeles, November 1992

Member of learned societies 

    French Physical Society
    European Physical Society, Fellow of the European Physical Society
    Member of the French Academy of Sciences since 2005

Doctorates Honoris Causa and distinctions 

    Doctor Honoris Causa of the Université de Sherbrooke and Speaker Walter Kohn, Canada, June 2005 
    Doctor Honoris Causa from the University of Stuttgart, Germany, November 2005 
    Fellow of the European Physical Society, October 2008

Decorations 

    Officier in the Ordre National du Mérite, November 2008   
    Chevalier in the Ordre of the Légion d'honneur, July 2016

Family 
Denis Jerome is the grandson of architect Lucien Bechmann who built part of the Cité Universitaire in Paris and the great grandson of Polytechnicien et ingénieur des Ponts et Chaussées Georges Bechmann who contributed to the construction of the North-South metro line in Paris and the construction of the sanitation network.

Publications 
 
 
    D. Jerome and H. J. Schulz: Organic conductors and superconductors, Advances in Physics, 51, 293-479, 2002.
    (en) D. Jérome, A. Mazaud, M. Ribault and K. Bechgaard, "Superconductivity in a synthetic organic conductor TMTSF2PF6", Journal de Physique Lettres, vol. 41, no. 4, 1980, p. 95-98 (read online[archive]).

References

1939 births
Living people
French physicists
Members of the French Academy of Sciences
University of Paris alumni